The House of Châtillon was a notable French family, with origins in the 9th century. The name comes from that of Châtillon-sur-Marne in Champagne, where members of the family were tenants in a castle belonging to the Counts of Champagne. Other branches of the family were in Saint-Pol-sur-Ternoise (extinguished in 1360), in Blois (extinguished in 1397), and in Penthièvre (extinguished in 1457).

Members of the house include:
  Odo of Châtillon, Pope under the name Urban II
Charles of Blois Châtillon (1319–1364), was canonized as saint, ruled over the Champagne branch. His claim to be Duke of Brittany, jure uxoris ignited the Breton War of Succession. His title would pass for a time to his descendants.
Walter III of Châtillon (1166–1219), Sénéchal of Burgundy, escorted Philip II of France to the Holy Land and distinguished himself at the siege of Acre and the battle of Bouvines.
Gaucher V of Châtillon (1249–1329) great-grandson of the former, constable of France under Philip IV of France and minister of  Louis X of France.
Joanna of Châtillon (c.1285–1354), Duchess of Athens
Marie de St Pol (c.1303–1377), foundress of Pembroke College, Cambridge
Jacques of Châtillon
Alice de Châtillon (Alisia of Antioch) 
Raynald of Châtillon (Not to be confused with Raynald of Châtillon-sur-Loing)

This house is totally distinct from the house of Châtillon-sur-Loing, which produced (among others) the Coligny brothers : Gaspard, François and cardinal Odet.

References